Dapsilanthus spathaceus is a species of flowering plant of the family Restionaceae native to Australia.

References

Restionaceae
Taxa named by Robert Brown (botanist, born 1773)